Elections to the French National Assembly were held in Chad and Ubangi-Shari on 2 June 1946. The territories elected two seats to the Assembly via two electoral colleges. René Malbrant was re-elected from the first college and Guy de Boissoudy in the second. Both were members of the Democratic and Socialist Union of the Resistance.

Results

First college

Second college

References

Chad
1946 06
1946 in Ubangi-Shari
Chad
1946 06
1946 in Chad
1946
June 1946 events in Africa